Appias maria is a species of pierine butterfly found in the Philippines and Japan.

Subspecies
A. m. maria (Philippines: Luzon)
A. m. adorabilis Fruhstorfer, 1910 (Philippines: Mindanao)
A. m. dolorosa Fruhstorfer, 1910 (Bohol, Bazilan)
A. m. kabiraensis Murayama, 1970 (Japan)

References

External links
  images representing Appias maria at Encyclopedia of Life

maria
Butterflies described in 1875
Butterflies of Asia
Taxa named by Georg Semper